was a village located in Ōchi District, Shimane Prefecture, Japan.

Description 
As of 2003, the village had an estimated population of 1,965 and a density of 26.54 persons per km². The total area was 74.03 km².

History 
On October 1, 2004, Hasumi, along with the towns of Iwami and Mizuho (all from Ōchi District), was merged to create the town of Ōnan.

Dissolved municipalities of Shimane Prefecture